Aline Silva dos Santos (born 17 August 1981), known as Aline Santos or simply Aline, is a Brazilian handball player. She has represented the Brazilian national team in two Olympics. She participated at the 2004 Summer Olympics in Athens and at the 2008 Summer Olympics in China.

References

External links 
 
 
 

1981 births
Living people
Brazilian female handball players
Olympic handball players of Brazil
Handball players at the 2004 Summer Olympics
Handball players at the 2008 Summer Olympics
Pan American Games medalists in handball
Pan American Games gold medalists for Brazil
Handball players at the 2007 Pan American Games
Expatriate handball players
Brazilian expatriate sportspeople in Spain
Brazilian expatriate sportspeople in Germany
Sportspeople from Rio de Janeiro (city)
Medalists at the 2007 Pan American Games
21st-century Brazilian women